"Boredom" is a song by American rapper Tyler, the Creator from his fourth studio album Flower Boy (2017). It is the second single from the album, and was released on July 11, 2017. The song features English singer Rex Orange County and Norwegian singer Anna of the North, with additional vocals from British singer Corinne Bailey Rae.

Background and composition 
Produced by Tyler, the Creator, the instrumental of the song opens with a guitar strum, followed by drum rolls and waves of electric organ. A flanging effect can be heard throughout the song. Tyler expresses his boredom, along with feelings of loneliness and isolation in the song. In an interview with comedian Jerrod Carmichael, Tyler spoke about him writing the song:I wrote that 5pm on a Saturday, laying on my back, looking so bored. It was nothing to do. No one was hitting me back. Jasper was in the other room, bored out of his mind but I didn't see him all day. My room was warm as hell because I like the heater on and it was nothing to eat but dry cereal. And I'm sitting there like what the fuck am I gonna do? I literally wrote that verse in like ten seconds.

Charts

Certifications

References 

2017 singles
2017 songs
Columbia Records singles
Songs about loneliness
Songs written by Tyler, the Creator
Sony Music singles
Tyler, the Creator songs